Nalle may refer to:

People
Given name:
—Note: Nalle (a Finnish word meaning "bear") is often a Finnish nickname for persons with the given name Björn (a Swedish word meaning "bear").
"Nalle" Wahlroos, Björn Wahlroos (born 1952), Finnish banker and businessman
"Nalle" Westerlund, Björn Westerlund (1912–2009), Finnish businessman and government bureaucrat
Nalle Hukkataival, (born 1986)  Finnish professional climber
Nalle Karlsson (born ?) Swedish songwriter
Nalle Colt (born ?), Swedish guitarist
Nalle Knutsson, (1943–2012), Swedish musician
Surname:
Dave Nalle (born 1959), American political writer, game author, and font designer
David Nalle (1924–2013) American diplomat, writer

Other 
Uppo-Nalle, bear and series of Finnish children's novels by the Finnish author Elina Karjalainen
Rock Nalle, stage name of Danish singer (1943–2022)
Nalle (band)
Nalle-Sisu, marketing name for Sisu KB-24 and KB-124 lorries

See also
O Nanna Nalle 2000 Kannada movie